Peggy Webb is an American politician from Montana. Webb is a Republican member of the Montana House of Representatives from District 43.

Early life 
Webb was born in Nebraska, U.S. Webb's father was Harold Eugene Moore (1929-2014) and her mother was Marion Moore (nee Copeland). In 1971, Webb graduated from Bartley High School, which is presently Southwest High School.

Career 
Webb was a math teacher, librarian, and a businesswoman. Webb became a real estate developer in Billings, Montana.

On November 8, 2016, Webb in the election and became a Republican member of Montana House of Representatives for District 43. Webb defeated Elizabeth Pincolini and Josh Daniels with 57.26% of the votes.
On November 6, 2018, as an incumbent, Webb won the election and continued serving District 43. Webb defeated Blair Koch with 64.90% of the votes.

Awards 
 2017 Honorable Mention. Presented by Montana Farm Bureau Federation.

Personal life 
Webb's husband is Roger Webb, a politician. They have two daughters. Webb and her family live in Billings, Montana.

References

External links 
 Peggy Webb at ballotpedia.org
 Rep. Peggy Webb at leg.mt.gov

Living people
Republican Party members of the Montana House of Representatives
Women state legislators in Montana
Year of birth missing (living people)
21st-century American politicians
21st-century American women politicians